The State Register of Heritage Places is maintained by the Heritage Council of Western Australia. , 108 places are heritage-listed in the Shire of Serpentine-Jarrahdale, of which five are on the State Register of Heritage Places.

List

State Register of Heritage Places
The Western Australian State Register of Heritage Places, lists the following five state registered places within the Shire of Serpentine-Jarrahdale:

Shire of Serpentine–Jarrahdale heritage-listed places
The following places are heritage listed in the Shire of Serpentine–Jarrahdale but are not State registered:

References

Serpentine